This is a list of important men's road bicycle racing events. The list only includes road races, and no track, mountain or cyclo-cross races.

Championships
UCI World Tour, used to be UCI ProTour
Five UCI Continental Circuits (Africa, America, Asia, Europe and Oceania)
World Championships
National Championships

One-day races
The Monuments, Elite and 1.HC One Day Races include races that are either part of the UCI World Tour, as well as races that are organized by the ASO, the RCS and Unipublic.

The 'Monument' Classics
Milano–San Remo, 
Tour of Flanders, 
Paris–Roubaix, 
Liège–Bastogne–Liège, 
Giro di Lombardia,

Additional elite one-day races
Strade Bianche, 
Cadel Evans Great Ocean Road Race, 
E3 Harelbeke, 
Gent–Wevelgem, 
La Flèche Wallonne, 
Amstel Gold Race, 
Clásica de San Sebastián, 
Bretagne Classic, 
Vattenfall Cyclassics, 
GP de Quebec. 
GP de Montréal,

Major UCI Continental Circuits one-day races (1.HC)
For the 2016 season, all but the very first and last 1.HC races take place in Europe.

Trofeo Laigueglia,  (1.HC in 2015)
Omloop Het Nieuwsblad, formerly known as Omloop Het Volk
Kuurne–Brussels–Kuurne, 
GP di Lugano, 
Nokere Koerse, 
Dwars door Vlaanderen,  (1.HC in 2013)
Scheldeprijs,  
Brabantse Pijl,  (1.HC in 2011)
GP de Denain, 
Rund um den Finanzplatz Eschborn–Frankfurt, 
GP of Aargau Canton, 
RideLondon–Surrey Classic, 
Brussels Cycling Classic,  (formerly Paris–Bruxelles)
GP du Fourmies, 
GP Impanis-Van Petegem, 
Giro dell'Emilia, 
GP Bruno Beghelli, 
Tre Valli Varesine, 
Milano–Torino, 
Gran Piemonte, 
Münsterland Giro, 
Paris–Tours, 
Japan Cup,

Other Continental Circuit one-day races (1.1 or 1.2)

Rund um Köln, 
Arnhem–Veenendaal Classic, formerly known as Veenendaal–Veenendaal (1.HC from 2005 until 2010)
Escalada a Montjuïc, 
GP d'Ouverture La Marseillaise, 
Vuelta a Murcia,  (a 2.1 stage race until 2012)
GP della Costa Etruschi, 
Klasika Primavera, 
Melbourne to Warrnambool Classic, 
Ronde van Drenthe, 
GP Miguel Induráin,  (1.HC from 2007 until 2012)
Philadelphia International Championship,  ( 1.HC from 2005 until 2012)
Volta Limburg Classic, formerly known as Hel van het Mergelland
Memorial Marco Pantani, 
Reading Classic, 
Rund um die Hainleite, 
Subida a Urkiola, 
Trofeo Mallorca, 
Clásica de Almería,  (1.HC in 2012 and 2013)
Beaumont Trophy, 
Rutland–Melton International CiCLE Classic, 
Tour of Almaty, 
Rhodes GP,  
Tour de Vendée,  (1.HC from 2010 until 2013)
Nationale Sluitingsprijs, 
Chrono des Nations, time trial

Defunct
(year is last edition)

Lancaster Classic, 
GP Gerrie Knetemann, 
Bordeaux–Paris,  (1988)
Classique des Alpes,  (2004)
Eindhoven Team Time Trial,  (2007)
GP di Lugano, (1979) as an ITT, being since then a one-day race
GP des Amériques, (1992)
GP des Nations,  (2004)
GP Wolber, (1931)
Paris–Brest–Paris, (1951) (continues as an amateur ultra-marathon endurance event)
Paris–Clermont-Ferrand, (1953)
Paris–Rouen (first cycling race), (1869)
San Francisco Grand Prix, (2005)
Trofeo Baracchi, (1991)
Wincanton Classic, (1997)
Giro del Lazio, 
Delta Profronde, 
Züri-Metzgete,  (2006) (continuing in 2008 as an amateur event)
Coppa Placci,  (2008)
Giro del Veneto,  (1.HC from 2005 until 2009)

Stage races
The Grand Tours, Elite and 2.HC Stage Races include races that are part of the UCI ProTour as well as races that are organized by the ASO, the RCS and Unipublic.

The Grand Tours
Giro d'Italia, 
Tour de France, 
Vuelta a España,

Additional elite stage races (world ranking)
Tour Down Under, 
Paris–Nice, 
Tirreno–Adriatico, 
Volta a Catalunya, 
Vuelta al País Vasco (Tour of the Basque Country), 
Tour de Romandie, 
Critérium du Dauphiné, 
Tour de Suisse, 
Tour de Pologne, 
BinckBank Tour,

Major UCI Continental Circuit stage races (2.HC)
Tour of Croatia, 
Dubai Tour, 
Tour of Qatar, 
Tour of Oman, 
Tour de Langkawi, 
Critérium International, 
Three Days of De Panne, 
Giro del Trentino,  (2.HC since 2011)
Tour of Turkey,  (2.HC since 2010)
Four Days of Dunkirk, 
Tour of California, 
Tour of Norway, 
Tour of Belgium, 
Tour de Luxembourg, 
Tour of Qinghai Lake, 
Tour de Wallonie, 
Danmark Rundt, 
Tour of Utah,  (2.HC in 2015)
Vuelta a Burgos, 
Arctic Race of Norway, 
Tour of Britain, 
Abu Dhabi Tour,

Other UCI Continental Circuit stage races (2.1 or 2.2)

Herald Sun Tour, 
Tour of Austria,  (2.HC from 2006)
Tour of Greece,  (2.1 from 2022)
Volta a Portugal,  (2.HC from 2005 until 2009)
Brixia Tour, 
Hong Kong Road Cycling Race, 
An Post Rás, 
Route du Sud, 
Giro di Sicilia,  
Setmana Catalana de Ciclisme, 
Settimana Internazionale di Coppi e Bartali, 
Ster Elektrotoer, 
Tour de Beauce, 
Tour de l'Avenir, 
Tour of Slovenia, 
Tour of Sibiu, 
Tour de Singkarak, 
Tour of South China Sea, 
Tour of Iran (Azerbaijan), 
Vuelta a Colombia, 
Vuelta a Asturias, 
Vuelta a Castilla y León, 
Vuelta a Andalucía, 
Volta a la Comunitat Valenciana, 
World Ports Classic, 
Tour of Estonia, 
Tour of Alberta, 
Tour de Yorkshire, 
Tour du Limousin,  (2.HC in 2011 and 2012)
Okolo Slovenska, 
Tour of Rhodes,  (2.2)
South Aegean Tour,  (2.2)
La Tropicale Amissa Bongo, 
Tour Internationale d'Oranie, 
Tour de Blida, 
Tour du Cameroun, 
Tour International de Sétif, 
Tour d'Annaba, 
Tour de Constantine, 
Tour du Maroc, 
Tour of Eritrea, 
Tour du Sénégal, 
Tour de Tunisie, 
Tour Ethiopian Meles Zenawi, 
Tour de Côte d'Ivoire-Tour de la Réconciliation, 
Grand Prix Chantal Biya, 
Tour du Faso, 
Tour of Rwanda,

Other stage races
Tour de Perth,

Defunct
(year is last edition)

 Tour of Beijing (2014)
 Deutschland Tour (2008)
 Course de la Paix (2006)
 Grand Prix des Nations (2004)
 Grand Prix du Midi Libre (2004)
 Petit Tour de France/Ronde de France (1946)(Little Tour de France, held during and shortly after WW2)
 Tour of Ireland (2009)
 Bayern Rundfahrt (2015)
 Giro di Padania (2012)
 Rome–Naples–Rome (1961)
 Ronde van Nederland (2004) (succeeded by the Eneco Tour)
 Catalan Cycling Week (2005)
 Euskal Bizikleta (was integrated into the Vuelta al País Vasco)
 Vuelta a Galicia (2000)
 Coors Classic (1988) (succeeded by the Tour de Trump)
 Tour de Trump (1990) (succeeded by the Tour DuPont)
 Tour DuPont (1996)
 Tour of Missouri
 Tour de Georgia
 USA Pro Cycling Challenge (2015)
 Colorado Classic (2018) — continuing as a standalone women's race

Multiple day, single stage races
Race Across America,  9 day single stage 
TransAm Bicycle Race,  17-day single stage, unsupported 
Transcontinental Race,  7-10 day single stage, unsupported

References

External links
Date-ordered list of websites of international cycling races: Especially websites of organizers of UCI events.

 
Events
Bicycle